Bedeau is a French Huguenot surname. It is derived from the French word bedeau, meaning 'beadle', a sergeant of justice. Notable people with the surname include:
Fitzroy Bedeau (born 1944), Grenadian politician
Jacob Bedeau (born 1999), English professional footballer
Marie Alphonse Bedeau (1804–1863), French general
Tony Bedeau (born 1979), Grenadian former footballer

References

French-language surnames